Hassan or Hasan is an Arabic masculine given name in the Muslim world.
 
As a surname, Hassan may be Arabic, Irish, Scottish, or Jewish (Sephardic and Mizrahic) (see Hassan (surname)).

Etymology and spelling 
The name Hassan in Arabic means 'handsome' or 'good', or 'benefactor'.

There are two different Arabic names that are both romanized with the spelling "Hassan". However, they are pronounced differently, and in Arabic script spelled differently.

 The more common name   (as in the name of the Islamic prophet Muhammad's grandson Hasan ibn Ali), coming from the Arabic language triconsonantal root Ḥ-S-N, has two short vowels and a single . Its meaning is 'the good' or 'the handsome'. Its usual form in Classical Arabic is الحسن al-Ḥasan, incorporating the definite article al-, which may be omitted in modern Arabic names.
 The name  , which comes from the same Arabic root, has a long vowel and a doubled . Its meaning is 'doer of good' or 'benefactor'. It is not used with the definite article in Classical Arabic.

In the romanized spelling Hassan, it is not possible to distinguish which of the two names is intended. The ambiguity can be removed by romanizing the former name as Hassan with a single s, and reserving the spelling with doubled s for the latter name, or romanizing the former as Hasan and the latter as Hassan.

King al-Ḥasan of Morocco (officially romanized as Hassan, with a double ss, due to the influence of French orthography) is an example of the former. The early Islamic poet Ḥassān ibn Thābit is an example of the latter. In the original Arabic, the two different names are easily distinguished.

Depending on language and region, spelling variations 
Hassan or Hasan is an Arabic given name and through the influence of Arabic, languages spoken by Muslims such as Persian, Kazakh, Kurdish, Urdu, Indonesian, Malaysian, Turkish, Uyghur, Turkmen, Somali, Swahili, Berber, Azerbaijani, Crimean Tatar, Tatar, Bosnian, Albanian, Bengali, etc. created their own spelling variations.

Therefore, depending on language and region, spelling variations include Hasan, Hassen, Hasson, Hassin, Hassine, Hacen, Hasen, Hasin, Hassa, Hess, Cassin, Chazan, Chasson, Chason, Khassan, Khasan, Chessar, Casan, Casen, Hasso, Lassana, Alassane, Lacen, Lasanah, Assan, Asan, or Haasan (Haasaan, Hasaan, Hassaan).

 List of variant spellings

 In Arabic transcription:  (Hasan),  (Hassan)
 In Turkish: Hasan
 In Ottoman Turkish:  (Hasan)
 In Persian:  (Hasan),  (Hassan)
 In Bosnian: Hasan or Haso
 In Albanian: Hasan
 In Azerbaijan: Həsən
 In Kurdish: Hesan
 In Kazakh:  (Qasen),  (Hasen or Khassen), Asan or Äsem 
 In Somali: Xasan
 In Bengali: হাসান (Hāsān)
 In Sub-Saharan Africa: Lassana, Alassane and Lacen, derived from al-Hassan.
 In French: Hassan, Hassen or Hacen
 In Spanish: Hassan, Hassán, Hacen, Hacén, Jassan, Jassán, Jasan or Jasán
 In Italian: Hassan
 In Russian transcription: Хасан (Hasan), Хассан (Hassan), Хассен (Hassen), Хэссан (Hessan), Гасан (Gasan)
 In Croatian or Serbian or Montenegrin: Aсан (Asan) or Хасан (Hasan) 
 In Finnish: Hasan
 In Chinese: 哈桑/哈山 (Hā Sāng/Hā Shān)
 In Korean: 하산 (Hasan)

People

Hacine
Hacine Cherifi, former French boxer

Hasan
Hasan I (disambiguation), number of people with the mononym
Hasan II (disambiguation), number of people with the mononym
Hasan ibn Ali, the first grandson of Muhammad, son of Ali ibn Abi Talib, and the second Imam of Shia Islam.
Hasan al-Mustadi Ibn al-Mustanjid famously known as al-Mustadi was the Caliph of the later Abbasid Caliphate from 18 December 1170 to 27 March 1180.
Abu l-Hasan Ali, Sultan of Granada, also known as Muley Hacén in Spanish
Hasan al-Askari, eleventh Imam of Twelver Shi‘ism
al-Ḥasan al-Baṣrī, prominent early Islamic scholar
Hasan az-Zaman, Bengali politician and educationist
Hasan Čengić, Bosnian former Deputy Prime Minister and Defense Minister
Hasan Cetinkaya, Swedish footballer
Hasan Corso, an Italian who was part of the army of janissaries in the Turkish army
Hasan Doğan, Turkish 37th president of the TFF
Hasan Gemici, Turkish sports wrestler
Hasan Fehmi Güneş, Turkish politician
Hasan Güngör, Turkish sports wrestler
Hasan Hamdan, Lebanese actor and voice actor
Hasan Irlu, Iranian diplomat
Hasan Izzet, Ottoman general
Hasan Kabze, Turkish footballer
Hasan Minhaj, American comedian
Hasan Muratović, former Bosniak rector of the University of Sarajevo and former prime minister
Hasan Piker (born 1991), Turkish-American Twitch streamer and political commentator
Hasan Polatkan (1915–1961), executed Turkish politician
Hasan Salihamidžić, Bosnian football midfielder
Hasan Sönmez, Turkish footballer
Hasan Şaş, Turkish footballer
Hasan Şerefli, Turkish filmmaker
Hasan Ali Yücel, Turkish minister of education
Hasan Nazih (1921–2012), Iranian lawyer and politician

Hasson
Hasson Arbubakrr, a former NFL and CFL player

Hassan
Prince Hassan, Served as Crown Prince of Jordan under King Hussein's reign
Hassan I of Morocco, alaouite sultan of Morocco
Hassan II of Morocco, the father of the current King of Morocco
Hassan Mohammed Abdirahman, real name of Somali singer-songwriter Aar Maanta
Hassan Adams, NBA player
Hassan Abdillahi, Somali journalist and activist
Hassan Akhavi, Iranian army general and politician
Hassan Al Alfi, Egyptian politician
Hassan Assad, converted name of professional wrestler Montel Vontavious Porter
Hassan al-Banna, founder of the Muslim Brotherhood
Hassan Abu Basha, Egyptian army general and politician
Hassan Bitar (born 1985), Lebanese footballer
Hassan Booker, American basketball player and coach
Hassan Brijany (1961–2020), Swedish actor
Hassan "Moni" Chaito, Lebanese footballer
Hassan "Shibriko" Chaito, Lebanese footballer
Hassan Farah 3rd Grand Sultan of the Isaaq
Hassan Abshir Farah, former Prime Minister of Somalia
Hassan Haskins (born 1999), American football player
Hassan Heshmat (1920–2006), Egyptian sculptor
Hassan Ibrahim (1917–1990), Egyptian military officer and politician 
Hassan Johnson, American actor
Hassan Jones, former professional American football player
Hassan Maatouk (born 1987), Lebanese footballer
Hassan Mezher (born 1981), Lebanese footballer
Hassan Mohamed, Qatari basketball player
Hassan Nader, retired Moroccan footballer
Hassan Nasrallah, leader of Hezbollah
Hassan Oumari (born 1986), Lebanese footballer
Hassan Al-Qazwini, Islamic Center Imam
Hassan Roshdieh, Iranian teacher, politician, and journalist
Hassan Rowshan, Iranian coach, manager, and former player
Hassan-i Sabbah, founder of the Hashshashin, "Assassins"
Hassan Shamsid-Deen, American football player
Hassan Sheikh Mohamud, President of Somalia
Hassan Ali Saad (born 1992), simply known as Soony Saad, Lebanese-American footballer
Hassan Kamel Al-Sabbah, a Lebanese electrical and electronics research engineer
Hassan Tuhami (1924–2009), Egyptian politician
Hassan Whiteside, American basketball player, NBA player
Hassan Younes (born 1943), Egyptian engineer and politician

Middle name
Muse Hassan Sheikh Sayid Abdulle, Somali politician and former army General
Salah-Hassan Hanifes, a Druze Israeli politician who served as a member of the Knesset

Hassane 
Hassane Alla (born 1980), Moroccan footballer 
Hassane Azzoun (born 1979), Algerian judoka
Hassane Brahim (born 1989), Chadian footballer
Hassane Dicko, Burkina Faso politician
Hassane Hamadi, Comorian politician
Hassane Kamara (born 1994), Gambian footballer

Middle name
Ibrahim Hassane Mayaki (born 1951), Niger politician and Prime Minister
Said Hassane Said Hachim (born 1932), Comorian politician

Hasaan
Hasaan Ibn Ali, American jazz pianist and composer, born William Henry Langford, Jr.

Hassanal
Hassanal Bolkiah (born 1946), the 29th Sultan and Yang Di-Pertuan of Brunei

Hassen
Hassen Bejaoui, Tunisian soccer player
Hassen Gabsi, a Tunisian soccer player

Khasan
Khasan Baroyev, Russian wrestler of Ossetian origin
Khasan Dzhunidov, Russian footballer
Khasan Isaev, Bulgarian freestyle wrestler
Khasan Israilov, Soviet Chechen journalist and poet
Khasan Mamtov, Russian footballer
Khasan Yandiyev, Russian judge

Khassan
Khassan Baiev, Chechen-American trauma surgeon

Fictional characters
 Ĥassan, character in the film A Girl Named Maĥmood
 Hassan, from Warner Bros. Merrie Melodies short featuring Bugs Bunny and Daffy Duck, Ali Baba Bunny
Hassan (C&C), General Hassan in the Command and Conquer continuity

See also
Abulhasan
Alassane
Hassan (surname)
Hussein
Lassana

References

Given names
Arabic masculine given names
Turkish masculine given names
Iranian masculine given names
Pakistani masculine given names

fr:Hassan
ja:ハサン
ru:Хасан (имя)